Protosolpuga carbonaria is an extinct species of solifuges, the only one of the genus Protosolpuga and the family Protosolpugidae. This Carboniferous camel spider was discovered in the Mazon Creek Formation in Illinois.

References 

Solifugae
Carboniferous arthropods
Carboniferous animals of North America
Fossils of the United States
Paleontology in Illinois
Fossil taxa described in 1913